Santiago de Compostela railway station is the railway station of the Galician capital Santiago de Compostela, Spain.

Services

References

Railway stations in Galicia (Spain)
Buildings and structures in Santiago de Compostela
Transport in Galicia (Spain)